Kirkwall Castle, also known as King's Castle, was located in Kirkwall, the main settlement in the Orkney Islands of Scotland. Built in the 14th century, it was deliberately destroyed in 1614. The last ruins were cleared in the 19th century. The castle was located around the corner of Broad Street and Castle Street in the centre of Kirkwall.

History
In the 14th century, Henry Sinclair, Earl of Orkney, (c. 1345 – c. 1400) held the Earldom of Orkney from King Haakon VI of Norway. Sinclair built the castle at Kirkwall soon after being granted the Earldom in 1379. In the early 17th century Patrick Stewart, 2nd Earl of Orkney, feuded with Laurence Bruce, Sheriff of Shetland. Stewart was arrested in 1610, and in May 1614 his son, Robert, rebelled against King James VI. Robert and his supporters occupied Kirkwall Castle, along with the Bishop's and Earl's Palaces, and St Magnus Cathedral. In August, George Sinclair, 5th Earl of Caithness led royal troops against the rebels, and Kirkwall Castle surrendered in September. On 26 October 1614 the Privy Council of Scotland ordered that Kirkwall Castle be demolished, although this was not carried out until the following year. The ruins stood until 1742, when James Douglas, 14th Earl of Morton, granted the stones to the Town Council to build a new town house and jail. A plaque dated 1865 on Castle Street marks the site of the castle.

References

Castles in Orkney
Demolished buildings and structures in Scotland
Former castles in Scotland
Kirkwall